Chris Downey (born 19 April 1983) is an English retired footballer who is last known to have played for AFC Fylde in his home country from 2008 to 2009, actualmente jugando en Orihuela Costa veteranos.

Singapore

Loaned to Sengkang Marine of the Singaporean S.League in 2002 from Bolton Wanderers, Downey debuted in a 2–3 loss to SAFFC which worsened the Dolphins' travails, making it their fourth defeat in a row. Fortunately, the Englishman broke his duck in a hitting in a free-kick on the 26th minute to salvage a 2–2 tie with Geylang United.

References

External links 
 Soccerbase Profile

Hougang United FC players
English expatriate footballers
Expatriate footballers in Singapore
Association football forwards
Living people
1983 births
Altrincham F.C. players
Flixton F.C. players
Trafford F.C. players
English expatriate sportspeople in Singapore
Singapore Premier League players
Bolton Wanderers F.C. players
AFC Fylde players
Leigh Genesis F.C. players
Mossley A.F.C. players
English footballers
Radcliffe F.C. players